William Alexander Smith (January 9, 1828 – May 16, 1888) was a U.S. Representative from the state of North Carolina.

Smith was born in Warren County, North Carolina and attended the common schools. He engaged in agricultural pursuits and was a member of the State constitutional convention in 1865 following the American Civil War. He was a member of the North Carolina State Senate in 1870. He was president of the North Carolina Railroad in 1868 and of the Yadkin River Railroad. He was elected as a Republican from the 4th District to the Forty-third Congress, serving from March 4, 1873 to March 3, 1875. Smith died in Richmond, Virginia and is interred in the city's  Hollywood Cemetery.

His home near Smithfield, North Carolina, the Atkinson-Smith House, was listed on the National Register of Historic Places in 1975.

References

1828 births
1888 deaths
Republican Party North Carolina state senators
Burials at Hollywood Cemetery (Richmond, Virginia)
Republican Party members of the United States House of Representatives from North Carolina
19th-century American politicians